Cottonwood Creek is a  long second-order tributary to Verdigre Creek in Knox County, Nebraska.

Course
Cottonwood Creek rises on the East Branch Verdigre Creek divide about 3 miles northeast of Royal, Nebraska and then flows generally north-northwest to join Verdigre Creek about 5 miles east of Venus, Nebraska.

Watershed
Cottonwood Creek drains  of area, receives about 27.0 in/year of precipitation, has a wetness index of 538.56, and is about 1.31% forested.

See also

List of rivers of Nebraska

References

Rivers of Antelope County, Nebraska
Rivers of Knox County, Nebraska
Rivers of Nebraska